Andrei Mikhailovich Driessen (born 15 December 1997) is a Russian born, New Zealand raised professional boxer. He has won multiple New Zealand national championships in two weight classes from light middleweight to middleweight. At regional level, Mikhailovich has also won the IBF Pan-Pacific and WBO Global middleweight belts.

Early life
Mikhailovich and his twin brother was born in Russia but was adopted from an orphanage in 1999 when they were 18 months old.

Amateur career
Mikhailovich amateur has been described as decent. During his amateur career he competed in multiple New Zealand National championships and has won the North Island Golden Gloves Championships. It was at an amateur boxing event where he met his current coach and manager Isaac Peach.

Professional career

Professional Debut, Gunnar Jackson Rivalry, New Zealand Champion 2018 - 2020
In April 2018, Mikhailovich made his professional boxing debut against Rob Ramsey. In the first 12 months of his professional boxing career, he defeated many credible opponents including Jerome Pascua, former WBA PABA and New Zealand Champion Adrian Taihia and former IBO Oceania Champion Chase Haley. In this time Mikhailovich fought multiple journeyman as well including Simon Julian and former New Zealand champion Daniel Maxwell.

In August 2019, Mikhailovich fought against his first major rival, former top 10 in the WBO Gunnar Jackson. The fight against Jackson was considered a grudge match as Mikhailovich called out Jackson earlier in the year. On top of that, Mikhailovich coach Isaac Peach has beaten Jackson in a past as a professional boxer. After ten rounds, Mikhailovhich won the fight by unanimous decision, almost winning every round against Jackson, securing himself his first professional boxing belt winning the New Zealand National (Pro Box NZ version) Middleweight title. After the fight, Jackson announced that he has retired from professional boxing.

In November 2020, Mikhailovich fought and defeated Marcus Heywood by unanimous decision for his second New Zealand title, but this time the PBCNZ version in the Super Welterweight division. In April 2021, he defended the title successfully against former New Zealand champion Shay Brock, winning the fight by TKO.

Alex Hanan Rivalry, Regional titles 2021 - 2022
In June 2021, Mikhailovich fought Alex Hanan (now known as Alex Walters) in a grudge match. The Rivalry started in July 2018 with Alex making comments about Andrei Mikhailovich in an interview with New Zealand YouTube Boxing Channel Gladrap. Mikhailovich responded with his own comments in December 2018 in his own interview with Gladrap saying “I want to fight you, I always wanted to fight you, and when I do I will back you up and probably knock you out”. Mikhailovich had a war of words with Alex at the press conference for their fight in May 2021 with Mikhailovich responding "Call me daddy... I’ll f*** you up". Right before the fight directly after the referee gave his last words before the fight, Alex landed a cheap gut shot to Mikhailovich. However, it did not affect Mikhailovich as he won the fight by TKO in the second round. Everything to do with the fight from the press conference, to the gutt punch pre fight, to the stoppage itself went viral over the internet, reaching millions of viewers.

In 2022, it was confirmed that Mikhailovich and his stablemate from Peach Boxing Jerome Pampellone signed a long term promoter agreement with Dean Lonergan. In April 2022, Mikhailovich took on 2002 Commonwealth Games light welterweight bronze medallist and Olympian King Davidson. It didn't take Mikhailovich as he landed less than 4 punches to knockout Davidson in less than a minute and fifteen second in the first round. In June 2022, Mikhailovich took on his next international opponent from Venezuela Ernesto Espana. Mikhailovich won the fight by third round stoppage winning his first regional titles including the IBF Pan Pacific middleweight title and WBO Global middleweight title. In June 2022, Mikhailovich made his debut in the world rankings in the Middleweight division with him reaching 13th in the IBF and 12th in the WBO. In July 2022, Mikhailovich took on New Zealander Francis Waitai. Despite winning the fight by unanimous decision, Mikhailovich was disappointed in his performance. In November 2022, it was anounnced that Mikhailovich would take on his current biggest rival Issac Hardman. Unfortanately 18 days after the announcement, the fight was postponed to 2023 due to Hardman partner giving birth to their child. Promoter Dean Lonergan said "Issac had a baby about three or four days ago. I got a phone call from his trainer saying 'look, Issac's not great at saying no. I don't think he can handle having a baby and fighting sort of three weeks apart'". Since his last fight, he has increased his ranking to 10th in the IBF and 12th in WBO.

Exhibition career 
In November 2019, Mikhailovich fought in China against their National Champion. The opponent was 10 kgs heavier then Mikhailovich.

Boxing titles

Amateur
 2016 Golden Gloves North Island Championship (Gold)

Professional
 Pro Box NZ
 New Zealand National Middleweight Title
 New Zealand Professional Boxing Commission
 New Zealand National Super Welterweight Title
International Boxing Federation
IBF Pan Pacific Middleweight Title
 World Boxing Organisation
 WBO Global Middleweight Title

Professional boxing record

Awards 
 2019 New Zealand Boxing Awards Boxer of the Year (Nominated)
 2019 New Zealand Boxing Awards Male Boxer of the Year (Nominated)
 2019 New Zealand Boxing Awards New Zealand Fight of the year (Nominated)
 2019 New Zealand Boxing Awards Knockout of the year (Won)
 2019 New Zealand Boxing Awards Champion of the year (Nominated)
 2019 New Zealand Boxing Awards Most Entertaining boxer of the Year (Won)
 2020 New Zealand Boxing Awards Most Entertaining boxer of the Year (Won)
 2021 New Zealand Boxing Awards Most Entertaining boxer of the Year (Won)
 2021 New Zealand Boxing Awards New Zealand Fight of the year (Won)
 2021 New Zealand Boxing Awards Knockout of the year (Won)

Personal life 
Mikhailovich is married and is a father of two boys

References

External links 

1997 births
Living people
Boxers from Auckland
New Zealand male boxers
New Zealand people of Russian descent
Light-middleweight boxers
Middleweight boxers
New Zealand professional boxing champions
Russian male boxers